The 1992 Ukrainian Transitional League was the first season of 3rd level professional football in Ukraine. The competition was divided into two groups according to geographical location in the country – 1 is western Ukraine and 2 is eastern Ukraine. The season stretched from April 4, 1992, through July 4, 1992.

Organization
After the fall of the Soviet Union of January 1, 1992, there were many Ukrainian clubs that participated in all tiers of the Soviet League system. Most of them were organized into pools for the Supreme (I tier) and the First (II tier) leagues of Ukraine. The participants of those two league also were included into the 1992 Ukrainian Cup competition.

The Supreme League of Ukraine composed of the groups included all six Ukrainian clubs of the Soviet Supreme League, both Ukrainian clubs of the Soviet First League, and most of the Ukrainian clubs (9) except the last two of the West Zone of the Soviet Second League also known as the Buffer League to differentiate it from the Soviet Lower Second League (B). Also to the Supreme League of Ukraine were admitted the top two teams of the Ukrainian Zone of the Soviet Lower Second League and the winner of the cup winner of the Ukrainian SSR (competed in the Ukrainian Zone of the Soviet Lower Second League).

The last two teams of the Buffer League and the 20 of 24 teams of the Ukrainian Zone of the Soviet Lower Second League organized the First League of Ukraine which as the Supreme consisted of two groups. The league also included the top three teams of the KFK competitions (Amateur competitions) of the Ukrainian SSR, while Dynamo, Chornomorets, and Shakhtar were allowed to introduced their second teams to the league.

The bottom three teams of the Ukrainian Zone of the Soviet Lower Second League were considered officially eliminated. They were, however, along with other top teams of the KFK competition organized into the semi-amateur Transitional League (or Transfer League) composed of 18 teams that were split into two groups geographically, Group 1 - West and North, Group 2 - East and South. The clubs that in 1992 competed in the Transfer League did not participate in the Ukrainian Cup. Upon the conclusion of the season the league would split into the 3rd tier Second League and the 4th tier Transitional League. The top four club from each group would qualify for the Second League, while the bottom five from each group would organize the next season's Transitional League.

Composition

Notes:
 Positions in the table for KFK competitions are shown in format #.# where the first digit represents a group # and the second digit is the actual final position in the 1991 KFK competitions that consisted of six groups.
 Lysonya played few games in Khodoriv, Lviv Oblast at the Tsukrovyk Stadium. Lysonia Berezhany was previously known as Nyva Berezhany
 Promin most of his games in Sambir, some - at the Kolos Stadium in Volia Baranetska.
 Bazhanovets played some games at the Avanhard Stadium.
 More played all its games in Prymorskyi
 Mayak changed its name to Olympik
 Druzhba played all its games in Berdyansk

Location map

Group 1

Top goalscorers

Group 2

Top goalscorers

See also
 Ukrainian First League 1992

External links
 1992 Ukrainian Transitional League (Aleksei Kobyzev, Russian)
 1992 Ukrainian Transitional League. Footballfacts.ru

1992
3
Ukra
Ukra
Ukrainian Third League seasons